The 1866 Massachusetts gubernatorial election was held on November 6.

Governor Alexander Bullock was re-elected to a second term in office, defeating Democrat Theodore Sweetser.

General election

Candidates
Alexander Bullock, incumbent Governor (Republican)
Theodore Sweetser (Democratic)

Results

See also
 1866 Massachusetts legislature

References

Governor
1866
Massachusetts
November 1866 events